The following is a timeline of the history of Pretoria, in the City of Tshwane Metropolitan Municipality, Gauteng province, South Africa.

Ancient
200 000 ya artefacts found in a rock shelter on the Erasmus Castle property.

19th century

1825
 Mzilikazi arrives in the Transvaal region.
 Mfecane, or the genocide of the people of the Transvaal by Mzilikazi lasts until 1840.
1837
 Mzilikazi and the Matabele defeated by the Voortrekkers and forced to flee across the Limpopo river
1840
First permanent white settlers in the Pretoria area.
 1848
David Botha builds a farmhouse that would later become the Pionier Museum.
1852
17 January: The Sand River Convention signed granting the Voortrekkers north of the Vaal river (Transvaal) self-government as the South African Republic
1853
16 November: The establishment of the Volksraad (parliament) of the South African Republic.
 M.W. Pretorius buys the farms of Elandspoort and Koedoespoort and later in November of the same year the town of Pretoria is founded on the two adjoining farms.
 1855
Pretoria founded by Voortrekkers to be the capital of the new Transvaal Republic.
 1867
Cullinan diamond field discovered near Pretoria.
 1873
 University of South Africa founded.
 De Volkstem Dutch/English-language newspaper begins publication.
 1874
Burgers Park layout of Pretoria's first botanical gardens. 
 1877
British annexation of the Transvaal 
 1879 
 St. Mary's Diocesan School for Girls was established.
 1880 
 16 December: Outbreak of the First Boer War
December: The city is besieged by Transvaal Republican forces.
 1881 
 March: The city is once again besieged by Transvaal Republican forces.
3 August: Pretoria Convention peace treaty signed ending the First Boer War. Transvaal independence reinstated with Pretoria as capital.
 1884
Kruger House built.
 1886
Melrose House built.
 1892
 Raadsaal (Transvaal parliament) rebuilt.
 State Museum founded focusing mostly on Natural History.
 Burgers Park laid out as the city's first botanical gardens.
 1896

Staats Model School built.
 1897 
 6 April: Fort Schanskop built.
 8 June: Palace of Justice built.
 4 September: Fort Wonderboompoort built.
 1898 
 18 January: Fort Klapperkop built.
 November: Fort Daspoortrand built.
 Pretoria News founded.
 1899
 Zoo founded.
 1900
5 June: British forces occupy the city.

20th century

1900s-1940s

 1901 - Pretoria Boys High School founded.
 1902
 31 May: The Treaty of Vereeniging is signed in Melrose House marking the end of the Second Boer War and the establishment of the British Transvaal Colony.
 Pretoria High School for Girls founded.
 Premier diamond mine begins operating near Pretoria at Cullinan.
 1903 - "Local self-government granted."
 1905
 Lady Selbourne suburb established.
 Large Cullinan Diamond discovered near Pretoria.
 1906 - Imported jacaranda trees planted. 
 1910
 Pretoria becomes the administrative capital of the British colonial Union of South Africa. 
 Pretoria railway station rebuilt.
 1913 - Union Buildings constructed in Arcadia.
 1920 
 Afrikaanse Hoër Meisieskool founded.
 Afrikaanse Hoër Seunskool founded.
 1922 - Christian Brothers' College was founded.
 1923 
Stadium built in Arcadia.
 Waterkloof House Preparatory School was founded. 
 1930 - University of Pretoria was founded.
 1931 
 Capitol Theatre (cinema) opens.
 14 October: Pretoria receives official city status.
 1935 - Pretoria City Hall built.
 1939 - 1 July: Trolleybuses in Pretoria begin operating.
 1940 - Atteridgeville suburb established.
 1942 - Danville suburb established.
 1946
 June: Pretoria National Botanical Garden established in the east of the city.
 Population: 167,649 city; 244,496 urban agglomeration.
 1948
 Groenkloof suburb established.
 Catholic Vicariate of Pretoria established.
 Clapham High School was founded. 
 1949
 Hercules becomes part of Pretoria.
 Voortrekker Monument erected.
 Die Hoërskool Wonderboom founded.

1950s-1990s
 1951
 Menlo Park suburb was established 
 Pretoria North High School was founded
 Population: 231,710 city; 285,379 urban agglomeration.
 Vlakfontein township established.
 1952 - Hoërskool Oos-Moot was founded. 
 1955
 Centenary of Pretoria celebrations under the mayoralty of Hilgard Muller
 The old German community hall is acquired by the National Theatre Organisation (NTO) and converted into the Breytenbach Theatre.
 Hillview High School was founded. 
 1956
 9 August Women's march.
 Historical Association of South Africa headquartered in Pretoria.
 1958 - 17 November The first theatre production opens at the Breytenbach Theatre.
 1959 - "Treason trial" of ANC leaders begins.
 1960 - Laudium township and Africa Institute of South Africa established.
 1961 - City becomes capital of the Republic of South Africa.
 1962 - Eersterus area established.
 1963 
 Die Hoërskool Menlopark was founded. 
 St. Alban's College was founded. 
 9 October: Rivonia Trial begins.
1964
 12 June: In the Rivonia Trial, Nelson Mandela's original 5-year sentence is extended to life sentence for high treason together with Denis Goldberg, Ahmed Kathrada, Govan Mbeki, Raymond Mhlaba, Andrew Mlangeni, Elias Motsoaledi and Walter Sisulu at the Palace of Justice.
 6 November: Vuyisile Mini is being hanged due to death penalty for treason together with Wilson Khayinga and Zinakile Mkaba.
 November: In the Little Rivonia Trial, sentence was introduced  for another treason: Wilton Mkwayi  received life sentence; Dave Kitson twenty years; Laloo Chiba eighteen years; John Matthews fifteen years and Mac Maharaj twelve years.
 1966 - Fort Klapperkop is restored and turned into the Fort Klapperkop Military Museum.
 1970 
 Population: 543,950 city; 561,703 urban agglomeration.
 Mamelodi Sundowns was established. 
 1972 
Daspoort Tunnel opens.
21 February: Trolleybuses in Pretoria cease operating.
 1974 - Hoërskool Overkruin was founded. 
 1975 - Pionier Museum opens in the oldest extant structure in Pretoria, a farmhouse circa 1848.
 1976 - The Glen High School was founded. 
 1976 - Soshanguve suburb was founded
 1977 - 12 September: Death of Steve Biko.
 1979
 Hoërskool Waterkloof was founded. 
 6 April Solomon Mahlangu, Umkhonto we Sizwe operative hanged due to death penalty.
 Menlyn Park shopping mall in business. 
 1981 
 State Theatre opens.
 Hoërskool Montana was founded. 
 1983 
 20 May: Church Street bombing was perpetrated by Umkhonto we Sizwe, the military wing of the African National Congress. The bombing killed 19, including two perpetrators, and wounded 217,
 Hoërskool Die Wilgers was founded. 
 1984 - Atteridgeville-Saulsville Residents Organisation formed.
 1985
 28 February Denis Goldberg was released from custody of Apartheid government after spending 22 years in Pretoria Central Prison white prison.
Large Golden Jubilee Diamond discovered near Pretoria
21 November The Mamelodi Massacre occurs after 8000 protesters march on the Mamelodi Town Council due to high rent. Thirteen people lost their lives.
 Population: 443,059 city; 822,925 urban agglomeration.
 1986 - Idasa institute founded.
 1987 - Willowridge High School was founded. 
 1988 - Hoërskool Garsfontein was founded. 
 1991
 Institute for Security Studies established.
 Population: 525,583 city; 1,080,187 metro.
 1993 - Radio Pretoria and Tuks FM radio begin broadcasting.
 1994
 City becomes part of the newly established Pretoria-Witwatersrand-Vaal province (later Gauteng).
 Inauguration of South African president Nelson Mandela.
 Pro Arte Alphen Park was founded. 
 1996
 Population: 692,348 city.
 Area of city: 229 square miles.
 South African Local Government Association headquartered in Pretoria.
 2000
 5 December: Pretoria becomes the seat of the newly established City of Tshwane Metropolitan Municipality.
 Impak newspaper begins publication.
 June: University of Pretoria's Mapungubwe Museum opens.
 Crawford College was founded.

21st century

 2001
 Website Tshwane.gov.za launched.
 Woodhill College was founded. 
2002
30 July: Pretoria Accord signed in Pretoria. It was an agreement made between Rwanda and the Democratic Republic of the Congo (DRC) in an attempt to bring about an end to the Second Congo War.
 2004
 Tshwane University of Technology established by merging several former institutions.
 8 March:Freedom Park is inaugurated by Thabo Mbeki.
 Woodlands Boulevard shopping centre in business.
 2005 
December: Shanty town unrest.
 2007 - Tyger Valley College was founded. 
 2008
August: Congress of South African Trade Unions demonstration.
 Ditsong Museums of South Africa is created in order to manage several Museums in Pretoria and Johannesburg.
2011
 Gautrain begins operating with stations at Hatfield, Pretoria Central and Centurion.
 August: Economic protest.
 Kgosientso Ramokgopa becomes mayor of Tshwane.
 Population: 2,921,488 in Tshwane.
 2012 
11 July: Construction begins on the A Re Yeng rapid bus transit system.
 2013 
31 January: Train collision injuring 300 people near the Kalafong station.
 2014 
 Air pollution in Tshwane reaches annual mean of 51 PM2.5 and 63 PM10, more than recommended.
 1 December: A Re Yeng rapid bus transit system launches.
 2016 
 20–23 June:Riots broke out in Tshwane over the ANC's selection of Thoko Didiza as mayoral candidate for Tshwane. The Tshwane riots result in the deaths of at least five people after it turned xenophobic in nature.
19 August: Solly Msimanga of the Democratic Alliance is sworn in as the Executive Mayor after the 2016 Municipal Elections.
 2017
 24 February: An Anti-Immigration Protest resulting in the arrest of 136 protesters.
 1 April: The grand opening of Time Square, Pretoria the second biggest casino complex in South Africa.
 2019
11 February: Solly Msimanga resigns as mayor
12 February 2019: Stevens Mokgalapa is elected mayor.
23 August 2019: Hoërskool Hendrik Verwoerd becomes as the newly Rietondale High School.

See also
 Pretoria history (af)
 List of Pretoria suburbs
 Timelines of other cities in South Africa: Cape Town, Durban, Johannesburg, Pietermaritzburg, Port Elizabeth

References

This article incorporates information from the Afrikaans Wikipedia and  French Wikipedia.

Bibliography

Published in 20th century
 
 
 
 

Published in 21st century

External links

  (Directory of South African archival and memory institutions and organisations)
  (Images, etc.)
  (Images, etc.)
  (Bibliography)
  (Bibliography)
  (Bibliography)
  (Bibliography of open access  articles)
 

 
Pretoria
Pretoria-related lists
pretoria
Pretoria